Fish slice may refer to:

 Fish slice, a dish similar to fishcake
 Fish slice (kitchen utensil), a serving implement, related to spatula